Marcel Felder and Caio Zampieri won the title, defeating Fabricio Neis and João Pedro Sorgi 7–5, 6–4 in the final.

Seeds

Draw

Draw

References
 Doubles Draw

Tetra Pak Tennis Cup - Doubles
2011 Doubles